Packet Tracer is a cross-platform visual simulation tool designed by Cisco Systems that allows users to create network topologies and imitate modern computer networks. The software allows users to simulate the configuration of Cisco routers and switches using a simulated command line interface. Packet Tracer makes use of a drag and drop user interface, allowing users to add and remove simulated network devices as they see fit. The software is mainly focused towards Cisco Networking Academy students as an educational tool for helping them learn fundamental CCNA concepts. Previously students enrolled in a CCNA Academy program could freely download and use the tool free of charge for educational use.

Overview 
Packet Tracer can be run on Linux, Microsoft Windows, and macOS. Similar Android and iOS apps are also available. Packet Tracer allows users to create simulated network topologies by dragging and dropping routers, switches and various other types of network devices. A physical connection between devices is represented by a 'cable' item. Packet Tracer supports an array of simulated Application Layer protocols, as well as basic routing with RIP, OSPF, EIGRP, BGP, to the extents required by the current CCNA curriculum. As of version 5.3, Packet Tracer also supports the Border Gateway Protocol.

In addition to simulating certain aspects of computer networks, Packet Tracer can also be used for collaboration. As of Packet Tracer 5.0, Packet Tracer supports a multi-user system that enables multiple users to connect multiple topologies together over a computer network. Packet Tracer also allows instructors to create activities that students have to complete. Packet Tracer is often used in educational settings as a learning aid. Cisco Systems claims that Packet Tracer is useful for network experimentation.

Role in Education
Packet Tracer allows students to design complex and large networks, which is often not feasible with physical hardware, due to costs. Packet Tracer is commonly used by NetAcad students, since it is available to them for free. However, due to functional limitations, it is intended by Cisco to be used only as a learning aid, not a replacement for Cisco routers and switches. The application itself only has a small number of features found within the actual hardware running a current Cisco IOS version. Thus, Packet Tracer is unsuitable for modelling production networks. It has a limited command set, meaning it is not possible to practice all of the IOS commands that might be required. Packet Tracer can be useful for understanding abstract networking concepts, such as the Enhanced Interior Gateway Routing Protocol by animating these elements in a visual form. Packet Tracer is also useful in education by providing additional components, including an authoring system, network protocol simulation and improving knowledge an assessment system.

PTTP protocol and CSR compatibility
In 2019, Cisco registered a new URI scheme with the IANA called "pttp". This protocol is used as part of Packet Tracer 7.2.2 capabilities to transmit data between Packet Tracer and Cisco's CSR routing platform. As of mid-2022, little is known about this protocol or its functionality.

See also
 GNS3

References

External links
 
 Packet Tracer 8.1.0
 Packet Tracer 3.0 for Apple iOS 8 or above
 Old versions of Cisco Packet Tracer - V7.1, v7.0, v6.3, v6.2
 Frequently asked questions about Cisco Packet Tracer

Cisco software
Computer science education